Lodi is an unincorporated community in Montgomery County, Mississippi, United States.

Wilson S. Hill, a U.S. Representative from Mississippi, was born near Lodi in 1863.

Notes

Unincorporated communities in Montgomery County, Mississippi
Unincorporated communities in Mississippi